Naningo is the debut and only EP by Swiss band Double.

Track listing

References

1983 debut EPs
Double (band) albums